The Kerala Sahitya Akademi Award for Novel is an award given every year by the Kerala Sahitya Akademi (Kerala Literary Academy) to Malayalam writers for writing a novel of literary merit. It is one of the twelve categories of the Kerala Sahitya Akademi Award.

Awardees

References

Awards established in 1958
Kerala Sahitya Akademi Awards
Malayalam literary awards
Fiction awards
1958 establishments in Kerala